"Adolescents" is the lead single from Incubus' seventh album, If Not Now, When?. It was posted on the band's website on April 4, 2011 (a physical release was released 15 days later, April 19). This is their first single in two years following the release of the Prince and the Revolution cover "Let's Go Crazy" (from the 2009 compilation Monuments and Melodies). It has since peaked at #3 on both the Billboard Alternative Songs chart, and on the Billboard Rock Songs chart, and peaked at #1 on Bubbling Under Hot 100 Singles.

Writing and composition
Regarding the decision to release the song as a single, guitarist Michael Einziger noted, "I think it’s the most easily digestible song for our fans. I was surprised when we turned all this music in, "Adolescents" was actually the last song we wrote for this album. We actually had a few other songs that we left off of the album and we didn't even know if we were going to put "Adolescents" on the album. It was kinda like one of the floater songs. I mean we loved all the songs but we wanted to make an eleven-song record; we didn't want to have a thirteen-song record. We wanted it to be less is more. Everybody that we played the music for seemed to just automatically think that song would be a good segue into this album for our fans."

Track listing
Digital download
 "Adolescents" – 4:48

Charts

Weekly charts

Year-end charts

References

External links

Incubus (band) songs
2011 singles
Songs written by Brandon Boyd
Songs written by Mike Einziger
Songs written by Chris Kilmore
2011 songs
Epic Records singles
Songs written by José Pasillas
Songs written by Ben Kenney
Black-and-white music videos